Anthony Barrette (born April 22, 1986) is a former Canadian football offensive lineman who played in the Canadian Football League (CFL). In the CFL's Amateur Scouting Bureau final rankings, he was ranked as the 13th best player for players eligible in the 2011 CFL Draft, and eighth by players in the Canadian Interuniversity Sport (CIS). He was drafted 16th overall by the Montreal Alouettes in the 2011 Draft and signed a contract with the team on May 26, 2011. He spent parts of three seasons with the Alouettes before signing with the Ottawa Redblacks on January 2, 2014. He played CIS football with the Concordia Stingers. Barrette retired in May 2014.

References

External links
Ottawa Redblacks bio

1986 births
Living people
Players of Canadian football from Quebec
Canadian football offensive linemen
Concordia Stingers football players
Montreal Alouettes players
People from Verdun, Quebec
Canadian football people from Montreal